Sylvania, Arkansas is an unincorporated community located in Lonoke County, Arkansas, United States.

References

Unincorporated communities in Lonoke County, Arkansas
Unincorporated communities in Arkansas